The Director-General of the Provincial Government of the Western Cape is the senior non-political official of the Provincial Government of the Western Cape province of South Africa. The Director-General is head of the Office of the Premier of the Western Cape.

List of Directors-General
 Neil Barnard
 Peter Marais acting
 Gilbert Lawrence acting, later official (2002–2007)
 Virginia Petersen acting (2007-)

External links
 Department of the Premier

Government of the Western Cape